Am I a Girl? is the second studio album by American singer and YouTube personality Poppy. It was released on October 31, 2018, by her own label I'm Poppy and Mad Decent. The Am I a Girl? Tour was performed throughout late 2018 and early 2019.

Before its release, Poppy had described the album as having a French, vaporwave and Kate Bush influence. Along with Diplo, it also includes collaborations with Fernando Garibay and Grimes.

Singles
"In a Minute" was released as the first single from the album on July 27, 2018. On August 10, the music video premiered alongside the release of second single "Time Is Up" featuring Diplo.

On October 12, 2018, Poppy released "Fashion After All" as the third single from the album, followed by fourth single "Hard Feelings" on October 19. "X" was released as the fifth single from the album on October 25, 2018. The music video for "X" was released on November 5, 2018.

On October 30, 2018, "Play Destroy", which features Canadian singer Grimes, was released early on Poppy's YouTube channel several hours before the album was out worldwide. This track received critical attention for its blend of pop and heavy metal. Maura Johnston of Rolling Stone described the album's shift into metal music in its latter half as a satisfying "critique of the mental whipsawing one has to do in order to survive in 2018", and Poppy referred to the genre as "Poppymetal".

Critical reception

Am I a Girl? received polarized reviews from music critics. Highsnobiety described Poppy as "intriguing if not wholly charismatic" and found that the album "is an enjoyable enough club record, but it fails to add anything new to the conversation". AllMusic noted Poppy's sense of humor is evident during the record and remarked that while "not as cohesive as Poppy.Computer, Am I a Girl? definitely isn't stale, and it succeeds at expanding Poppy's sound and identity enough to keep fans listening and guessing."

Track listing
Credits adapted from Tidal.

Notes
 "Interlude 1" and "Interlude 2" are each titled as "+" on the physical versions of the album.

References

2018 albums
Poppy (entertainer) albums
Albums produced by Fernando Garibay
Albums produced by Diplo
Nu metal albums by American artists